Dimension 20 is a tabletop role-playing game show produced by CollegeHumor, and generally hosted by Brennan Lee Mulligan as the show's regular Dungeon Master. Most of the games use Dungeons & Dragons 5th edition. Seasons of the show alternate between major campaigns, featuring a returning cast of players with seventeen or more episodes, and side quests with rotating guests lasting ten episodes or fewer.

History
Dimension 20 originated as a production for Dropout, a streaming service aimed at delivering content with R-rated material or unusual formatting which launched in 2018. Dimension 20 was among the shows listed for the service when it was first unveiled. Mulligan cited a number of existing tabletop shows as inspiration for Dimension 20, including NADDPOD (Not Another D&D Podcast), The Adventure Zone and Critical Role. The format for the show, with distinct arcs based on different settings, was determined early on in the show's development.

The show debuted in 2018 with Fantasy High as the first campaign presented. The strong fan response from the first season resulted in Fantasy High being renewed for a live season, known as Fantasy High: Sophomore Year. Episodes of Fantasy High: Sophomore Year were streamed live on Twitch, as opposed to pre-recorded, edited, and uploaded to YouTube. The season concluded with a two-part finale titled “Spring Break! I Believe in You!”, which was streamed remotely. Through social media, the Dimension 20 team confirmed that they have plans to continue the story of “The Bad Kids” with a third season in the Fantasy High series.

In January 2020, major layoffs took place at CollegeHumor, including much of the cast. The show nevertheless continued production remotely as California’s Stay at Home orders were put into effect. 
On May 24, 2021, Brennan Lee Mulligan announced in a video on Dropout that Dimension 20 and other CollegeHumor projects would resume production in-person and in-studio, adhering to COVID safety guidelines set by SAG-AFTRA and other film guilds and production unions.

Format
With some notable exception, each season of Dimension 20 presents its own adventure or “campaign” with its own unique world and characters. Most seasons feature a core cast known by fans as the “Intrepid Heroes” (Ally Beardsley, Emily Axford, Lou Wilson, Brian Murphy, Zac Oyama, and Siobhan Thompson), but for alternating seasons nicknamed "side quests," the show invites guest players, generally other members of CollegeHumor or figures from the TTRPG community. As of October 2022, Dimension 20 has had nine side quests: Escape from the Bloodkeep (featuring Matthew Mercer of Critical Role, and Erika Ishii of L.A. by Night), Tiny Heist (featuring the cast of The Adventure Zone), Pirates of Leviathan (featuring Marisha Ray of Critical Role, with Mercer returning), Mice & Murder (featuring many CollegeHumor alum), Misfits and Magic (the first campaign to feature a guest DM, Aabria Iyengar, with Brennan Lee Mulligan as a player), The Seven, Shriek Week, Coffin Run, and A Court of Fey and Flowers. Brennan Lee Mulligan is usually the Dungeon Master, but beginning with the ninth season, Misfits & Magic, the show adopted rotating Game Masters. The change was announced via a trailer with an attached FAQ document.

Campaigns
The campaigns use the Dungeons & Dragons 5th edition system with Brennan Lee Mulligan as the Dungeon Master (DM) unless otherwise stated. The DM also creates house rules that make the game run differently from the normal system.

Supplementary shows 
CollegeHumor publishes additional videos that discuss elements of role-playing (Adventuring Academy) or specifics about the first season (Dimension 20 Fantasy High Extra Credit). These are released via YouTube.

Dropout also features a Q&A and talkback show tied to various seasons of Dimension 20 called Adventuring Party. The first four seasons centered around A Crown of Candy, Pirates of Leviathan, The Unsleeping City: Chapter II, and Mice and Murder were all filmed remotely and aired live following the release of the episode of Dimension 20 aired that week, where fans submit questions that Mulligan and the cast will answer. Once filming resumed in The Dome, however, the format changed to that of a commentary talkback show pre-recorded immediately after the filming of the previous episode.

One-Shots 
Dropout has released multiple one-shot adventures in addition to their full-length campaigns, such as Dimension 20: Fantasy High! Live! at The Bell House, Fantasy High LIVE at RTX Austin, Boys' Night! (Roll20Con), and College Visit (RTX @ Home Live).

Reception 
Comic Book Resources warmly received the show, describing it as "among the best of its kind". The review highlighted the arc based format, which keeps the story fast paced and allows the rotation of new players and voices in the space. The show has also been praised for its positive LGBTQ representation, with multiple characters exploring their sexualities during the two seasons of Fantasy High.

Glen Weldon, for NPR in 2021, wrote: "Mulligan is such a good DM and he's got so many improv skills. He's such a close and responsive listener that no matter what the players throw at him, he can always roll with it, without breaking the game. And that is a very rare skill, so it's terrific stuff". Weldon compared the show to Critical Role and highlighted that the cast is "sketch and improv comedians. While the folks at Critical Role are often very funny, they're actors. [...]  At Dimension 20, if they can go for a joke, they're going to go for the joke, and that might line up closer to my sensibility".

Justin Carter, in a review of A Starstruck Odyssey for Gizmodo, stated that "the consistency with which Dimension 20 shakes things up has helped give it a different kind of longevity compared to some of its fellow Actual Play titans, and each season [...] is able to feel like a natural part of the franchise while also its own distinct thing". Carter highlighted that "several of the season’s best events are too good to spoil, but every episode has at least two moments of incredible, often hilarious roleplaying from the cast. [...] Starstruck’s blend of strange humor and character drama feels a little bit more reined in than some earlier seasons and not prone to bits that could admittedly go on a little longer than necessary". Carter commented that this season has an infectious joy to it and that it takes the "fun to new, cosmic heights".

References

2010s American LGBT-related television series
2010s YouTube series
2018 podcast debuts
2018 web series debuts
2020s American LGBT-related television series
2020s YouTube series
Actual play podcasts
Actual play web series
American LGBT-related web series
Audio podcasts
CollegeHumor
Dungeons & Dragons actual play
Fantasy podcasts
Dropout